The Camogie All Star Awards are awarded each November to 15 players who have made outstanding contributions to the Irish stick and ball team sport of camogie in the 15 traditional positions on the field: goalkeeper, three full backs, three half-backs, two midfields, three half-forwards and three full-forwards. They were awarded for the first time in 2003 as an independent initiative sponsored by a hotel group and accorded official status by the Camogie Association in 2004.

In 2004 a team of the century was also chosen to commemorate the centenary of the sport. O'Neill's are the present title sponsors of the awards. The leading awards winner is Gemma O'Connor of Cork with eleven awards.

Past winners

2000s

2003 (unofficial)
Jovita Delaney (Tipperary), Rose Collins (Limerick), Una O'Dwyer (Tipperary), Stephanie Dunlea (Cork), Mary O'Connor (Cork), Ciara Gaynor (Tipperary), Therese Brophy (Tipperary), Vera Sheehan (Limerick), Jane Adams (Antrim), Emer Dillon (Cork), Clare Grogan (Tipperary), Eileen O'Brien (Limerick), Eimear McDonnell (Tipperary), Deirdre Hughes (Tipperary), Fiona O'Driscoll (Cork)

2004
Aoife Murray (Cork), Suzanne Kelly (Tipperary), Una O'Dwyer (Tipperary), Áine Codd (Wexford), Mary Leacy (Wexford), Ciara Gaynor (Tipperary), Therese Brophy (Tipperary), Kate Kelly (Wexford), Gemma O'Connor  (Cork), Jennifer O'Leary (Cork), Máirín McAleenan (Down), Claire Grogan (Tipperary), Ann Marie Hayes (Galway), Deirdre Hughes (Tipperary), Sinéad Millea (Kilkenny)

List of nominees

2005
Jovita Delaney (Tipperary), Sinéad Cahalan (Galway), Catherine O'Loughlin (Wexford), Julie Kirwan (Tipperary), Anna Geary (Cork), Mary O'Connor (Cork), Therese Maher (Galway), Gemma O'Connor (Cork), Ciara Lucey (Dublin), Jennifer O'Leary (Cork), Rachel Moloney (Cork), Clare Grogan (Tipperary), Eimear McDonnell (Tipperary), Catherine O'Loughlin (Clare), Emer Dillon (Cork)

List of nominees

2006
Jovita Delaney (Tipperary), Regina Glynn (Galway), Suzanne Kelly (Tipperary), Rena Buckley (Cork), Philly Fogarty (Tipperary), Mary O'Connor (Cork), Anna Geary (Cork), Gemma O'Connor (Cork), Kate Kelly (Wexford), Joanne Ryan (Tipperary), Briege Corkery (Cork), Jennifer O'Leary (Cork), Imelda Kennedy (Kilkenny), Louise O'Hara (Dublin), Veronica Curtin (Galway)

List of nominees

2007
Mags Darcy (Wexford); Eimear Brannigan (Dublin), Catherine O'Loughlin (Wexford), Rose Collins (Limerick); Rena Buckley (Cork), Mary Leacy (Wexford) Cathriona Foley (Cork); Gemma O'Connor (Cork), Philly Fogarty (Tipperary); Veronica Curtin (Galway), Aisling Diamond (Derry), Jennifer O'Leary (Cork); Kate Kelly (Wexford), Clare Grogan (Tipperary), Una Leacy (Wexford)

List of nominees

2008
Aoife Murray (Cork), Cathriona Foley (Cork), Catherine O'Loughlin (Wexford), Trish O'Halloran (Tipperary), Michaela Morkan (Offaly), Sinéad Cahalan (Galway), Gemma O'Connor (Cork), Briege Corkery (Cork), Orla Cotter (Cork), Jessica Gill (Galway), Therese Maher (Galway), Aoife Neary (Kilkenny), Síle Burns (Cork), Rachel Moloney (Cork), Jane Adams (Antrim)

List of nominees

2009
Aoife Murray (Cork), Regina Glynn (Galway), Cathriona Foley (Cork), Jacqui Frisby (Kilkenny), Ann Marie Hayes (Galway), Mary O'Connor (Cork), Elaine Aylward (Kilkenny), Briege Corkery (Cork), Ann Dalton (Kilkenny), Katie Power (Kilkenny), Gemma O'Connor (Cork), Therese Maher (Galway), Aoife Neary (Kilkenny), Grainne McGoldrick (Derry), Rachel Moloney (Cork)

List of nominees

2010s

2010
Mags D'Arcy (Wexford), Claire O'Connor (Wexford), Catherine O'Loughlin (Wexford), Niamh Kilkenny (Galway), Regina Glynn (Galway), Mary Leacy (Wexford), Anna Geary (Cork), Orla Kilkenny (Galway), Ann Dalton (Kilkenny), Kate Kelly (Wexford), Una Leacy (Wexford), Brenda Hanney (Galway), Katrina Parrock (Wexford), Ursula Jacob (Wexford), Aislinn Connolly (Galway).

List of nominees

2011
Susan Earner (Galway); Claire O'Connor (Wexford), Catherine O'Loughlin (Wexford); Lorraine Ryan (Galway), Ann Marie Hayes, (Galway), Therese Maher (Galway); Anna Geary (Cork), Niamh Kilkenny (Galway), Jill Horan (Tipperary), Kate Kelly (Wexford), Una Leacy (Wexford), Jennifer O'Leary (Cork), Katrina Parrock (Wexford), Ursula Jacob (Wexford), Brenda Hanney (Galway).

List of nominees

2012
Aoife Murray (Cork), Claire O'Connor (Wexford), Catherine O'Loughlin (Wexford), Sheila O'Sullivan (Offaly), Pamela Mackey (Cork), Gemma O'Connor (Cork), Deirdre Codd (Wexford), Niamh Kilkenny (Galway), Jennifer O'Leary (Cork), Kate Kelly (Wexford), Niamh McGrath (Galway), Briege Corkery (Cork), Katriona Mackey (Cork), Ursula Jacob (Wexford), Katrina Parrock (Wexford).

List of nominees

2013
Susan Earner (Galway), Mairead Power (Kilkenny), Sarah Dervan (Galway), Lorraine Ryan (Galway), Edwina Keane (Kilkenny), Therese Maher (Galway), Chloe Morey (Clare), Niamh Kilkenny (Galway), Jennifer O'Leary (Cork), Katie Power (Kilkenny), Niamh McGrath (Galway), Kate Kelly (Wexford), Shelly Farrell (Kilkenny), Elaine Dermody (Offaly), Ailish O'Reilly (Galway).

List of nominees

2014
Aoife Murray (Cork), Joanne O'Callaghan (Cork), Máire McGrath (Clare), Sarah Dervan, (Galway), Eimear O’Sullivan (Cork), Gemma O'Connor (Cork), Collette Dormer (Kilkenny), Rena Buckley (Cork), Ann Dalton (Kilkenny), Jennifer O'Leary (Cork), Orla Cotter (Cork), Briege Corkery (Cork), Michelle Quilty (Kilkenny), Ursula Jacob (Wexford), Katriona Mackey (Cork).

List of nominees

2015
Aoife Murray (Cork), Pamela Mackey (Cork), Sarah Dervan (Galway), Heather Cooney (Galway), Rena Buckley (Cork), Gemma O'Connor (Cork), Lorraine Ryan (Galway), Niamh Kilkenny (Galway), Ashling Thompson (Cork), Orla Cotter (Cork), Niamh McGrath (Galway), Kate Kelly (Wexford), Briege Corkery (Cork), Molly Dunne (Galway), Ailish O'Reilly (Galway).

List of nominees

2016
Emma Kavanagh (Kilkenny), Pamela Mackey (Cork), Sarah Dervan (Galway), Collette Dormer (Kilkenny), Rebecca Hennelly (Galway), Ann Dalton (Kilkenny), Meighan Farrell (Kilkenny), Orla Cotter (Cork), Miriam Walsh (Kilkenny), Denise Gaule (Kilkenny), Julieanne Malone (Kilkenny), Aoife Donohue (Galway), Michelle Quilty (Kilkenny), Kate Kelly (Wexford), Katriona Mackey (Cork)

List of nominees

2017
Aoife Murray (Cork), Rena Buckley (Cork), Catherine Foley (Kilkenny), Laura Treacy (Cork), Gemma O'Connor (Cork), Ann Dalton (Kilkenny), Eimear O'Sullivan (Cork), Meighan Farrell (Kilkenny), Ashling Thompson (Cork), Katriona Mackey (Cork), Katie Power (Kilkenny), Orla Cotter (Cork), Ailish O'Reilly (Galway), Aisling Maher (Dublin), Aoife Donohue (Galway)

List of nominees

2018

List of nominees

2019

Sarah Healy (Galway), Shauna Healy (Galway), Sarah Dervan (Galway), Edwina Keane (Kilkenny), Heather Cooney (Galway), Claire Phelan (Kilkenny),
Lorraine Bray (Waterford), Aoife Donohue (Galway), Niamh Kilkenny (Galway), Niamh Mulcahy (Limerick), Denise Gaule (Kilkenny), Amy O’Connor (Cork), Michelle Quilty (Kilkenny), Ailish O’Reilly (Galway), Beth Carton (Waterford).

List of nominees

2020s

2020

Áine Slattery (Tipperary); Shauna Healy (Galway), Claire Phelan (Kilkenny), Mary Ryan (Tipperary); Hannah Looney (Cork), Karen Kennedy (Tipperary), Davina Tobin (Kilkenny); Chloe Sigerson (Cork), Grace Walsh (Kilkenny); Niamh Rockett (Waterford), Orla Cronin (Cork), Denise Gaule (Kilkenny); Orlaith McGrath (Galway), Miriam Walsh (Kilkenny), Anne Dalton (Kilkenny).

2021
Sarah Healy (Galway); Shauna Healy (Galway), Sarah Dervan (Galway), Davina Tobin (Kilkenny); Megan Farrell (Kilkenny), Laura Treacy (Cork), Laura Hayes (Cork); Niamh Kilkenny (Galway), Hannah Looney (Cork); Aoife Donohoe (Galway), Katie Nolan (Kilkenny), Denise Gaule (Kilkenny); Siobhan McGrath (Galway), Orlaith McGrath (Galway), Ailish O' Reilly (Galway)

2022
Aoife Norris (Kilkenny); Libby Coppinger (Cork); Grace Walsh (Kilkenny); Shauna Healy (Galway); Laura Murphy (Kilkenny); Claire Phelan (Kilkenny); Saoirse McCarthy (Cork); Aisling Thompson (Cork); Lorraine Bray (Waterford); Denise Gaule (Kilkenny); Beth Carton (Waterford); Julianne Malone (Kilkenny); Katie Nolan (Kilkenny); Katriona Mackey (Cork).

Soaring Stars
Soaring Star Camogie Awards introduced in 2009 recognises outstanding players from the Junior camogie championship grades.

2009
Audrey Kennedy (Offaly), Fiona Stephens (Offaly), Eimear Moynan (Laois), Karen Brady (Offaly), Karen Tinelly (Down), Michaela Morkan (Offaly), Louise Donoghue (Meath), Louise Mahony (Laois), Niamh Coyle (Roscommon), Arlene Watkins (Offaly), Catherine McGourty (Down), Áine Lyng (Waterford), Susie O'Carroll (Kildare), Karen Kelly (Waterford), Elaine Dermody (Offaly).

2010
Caroline Connaughton (Roscommon), Rhona Torney (Antrim), Shona Curran (Waterford), Regina Gorman (Kildare), Fionnuala Carr (Down), Jennie Simpson (Waterford), Bernie Murray (Armagh), Kerrie O'Neill (Antrim), Michaela Convery (Antrim), Áine Lyng (Waterford), Shannon Graham (Antrim), Sarah Anne Fitzgerald (Laois), Jane Adams (Antrim), Jane Dolan (Meath).

2011
Aisling O'Brien (Waterford), Emma Hannon (Waterford), Jennie Simpson (Waterford), Orla Maginn (Down), Áine Keogh (Meath), Fionnuala Carr (Down), Gráinne Kenneally (Waterford), Patricia Jackman (Waterford), Pamela Greville (Westmeath), Catherine McGourty (Down), Nicola Morrissey (Waterford), Jane Dolan (Meath), Colette McSorley (Armagh), Karen Kelly (Waterford), Niamh Mallon (Down),

2012
Emily Mangan (Meath), Karen Tinnelly (Down), Claire Coffey (Meath), Fiona O'Neill (Meath), Lisa McCrickard (Down), Sarah Ann Fitzgerald (Laois), Aoife Thompson (Meath), Catherine McGourty (Down), Kristina Troy (Meath), Susie O'Carroll (Kildare), Jane Dolan (Meath), Aileen Donnelly (Meath), Niamh Mallon (Down), Sinead Hackett (Meath), Sarah Louise Carr (Down)

2013
Laura Dunne (Laois), Karen Tinnelly (Down), Aoife Trant (Kildare), Kate Aherne (Offaly), Aishling Dunphy (Laois), Sarah Ann Fitzgerald (Laois), Angela Lyons (Kildare), Carol Ann Canning (Dublin, Orla Bambury (Kildare), Clodagh Flanagan (Kildare), Siobhan Hurley (Kildare), Louise Mahony (Laois), Denise McGrath (Westmeath), Susie O'Carroll (Kildare), Niamh Dollard (Laois).

2014
Laura Dunne (Laois), Karen Tinnelly (Down), Ciara McGovern (Down), Deirdre Johnstone (Dublin) Eimear Delaney (Laois), Lisa McAliskey (Down), Fionnuala Carr (Down), Dinah Loughlin (Westmeath), Karen McMullan, (Down), Annette McGeeney (Roscommon), Sarah-Anne Fitzgerald (Laois), Catherine McGourty (Down), Niamh Mallon (Down), Niamh Dollard (Laois), Kelley Hopkins (Roscommon)

2015
Susan Spillane (Roscommon), Rachel Fitzmaurice (Roscommon), Laura-Marie Maher (Laois), Louise Mahony (Laois), Sarah-Anne Fitzgerald (Laois), Pamela Greville (Westmeath)

2016
Ciara Donnelly (Armagh), Bernie Murray (Armagh), Eleanor Tracey (Carlow), Ciara Quirke (Carlow), Kelley Hopkins (Roscommon), Dinah Loughlin (Westmeath)

2017
Laura Doherty (Westmeath), Caoimhe McCrossan (Westmeath), Aoife Bugler (Dublin)

2018
Deirdre Johnstone (Dublin), Caragh Dawson (Dublin)

2022
Áine Graham (Antrim)

2. Ciara Hickey (Galway)

3. Ciara Donohue (Galway)

4. Ashling Moloney (Cork)

5. Katie Manning (Galway)

6. Lisa Casserly (Galway)

7. Gráinne McNicholl (Derry)

8. Jennifer Hughes (Galway)

9. Emma Laverty (Antrim)

10. Joanne Casey (Cork)

11. Katie Gilchrist (Galway)

12. Aoife Minogue (Meath)

13. Dervla Cosgrove (Antrim)

14. Niamh McPeake (Galway)

15. Lauren Homan (Cork)

Intermediate Soaring Stars

2010
Elaine Dermody (Offaly), Michaela Morkan (Offaly), Ciara O'Connor (Wexford).

2011
Ciara O'Connor (Wexford), Frances Doran (Wexford), Jane Adams (Antrim).

2012
Sinead Cassidy (Derry), Katie McAnenly (Derry), Sarah Noone (Galway)

2013
Rebecca Hennelly (Galway), Niamh Mulcahy (Limerick), Paula Kenny (Galway)

2014
Niamh Mulcahy, (Limerick), Caoimhe Costelloe, (Limerick), Catherine Foley (Kilkenny)

2015
Susie O'Carroll (Kildare), Melissa Lyons (Kildare), Lorraine Bray (Waterford), Beth Carton (Waterford), Patricia Jackman (Waterford),  Jane Dolan (Meath)

2016
Jenny Clifford (Kilkenny), Ciara Holden (Kilkenny), Linda Collins (Cork), Chloe Sigerson (Cork), Aisling Burke (Laois), Jane Dolan (Meath)

2017
Emily Mangan (Meath), Sarah Harrington (Cork), Claire Coffey (Meath), Niamh Ní Chaoimh (Cork), Emma Brennan (Carlow), Sarah Buckley (Cork), Emer Reilly (Kildare), Megan Thynne (Meath), Keeva McCarthy (Cork), Amy Gaffney (Meath), Aoife Minogue (Meath), Jane Dolan (Meath)

2018
Amy Lee (Cork), Leah Weste (Cork), Sarah Harrington (Cork), Alannah Savage (Down), Fionnuala Carr (Down), Jennifer Barry (Cork), Katelyn Hickey (Cork), Paula Gribben (Down), Jenny Grace (Tipperary), Saoirse McCarthy (Cork), Niamh Mallon (Down), Sara-Louise Carr (Down), Caitríona Collins (Cork)

Team of the Century
Eileen Duffy-O'Mahony (Dublin), Liz Neary (Kilkenny), Marie Costine-O'Donovan (Cork), Mary Sinnott-Dinan (Wexford), Bridie Martin-McGarry (Kilkenny), Sandie Fitzgibbon (Cork), Margaret O'Leary-Leacy (Wexford), Mairéad McAtamney-Magill (Antrim), Linda Mellerick (Cork), Sophie Brack (Dublin), Kathleen Mills-Hill (Dublin), Una O'Connor (Dublin), Pat Moloney-Lenihan (Cork), Deirdre Hughes (Tipperary), Angela Downey-Browne (Kilkenny)

Other awards

Player of the Year (Various Sponsors)
The Irish Independent sports star of the week, selected by newspaper sports staff, was traditionally accorded to a camogie player once each year on the week of the All Ireland final. Annual Cúchulainn All Star awards were introduced as part of the first Gaelic Weekly All-star awards scheme, initiated by a group of sportswriters led by Mick Dunne and awarded on the same selectorial basis as the Gaelic football and hurling all stars are today, though without a major sponsor. They were awarded to two camogie players in 1964–7, reduced to one in 1968–9. The camogie selectors for 1964 were Maeve Gilroy, Kathleen Mills and Lil O'Grady and those of 1965 were Kathleen O'Duffy, Síghle Nic an Ultaigh and Eithne Neville. In the 1970s the GAA Player of the month scheme, awarded one of its monthly awards, usually in November, to a camogie player. The scheme, initiated by sports journalist and historian David Guiney and also selected by sportswriters, became an effective player of the year award under three successive sponsors, B+I Line, Irish Nationwide and Eircell. The camogie player of the year was revived as part of the Powerscreen all star award scheme in and an official player of the year award was introduced in 2005.

 1963 Úna O'Connor (Dublin)
 1963 Deirdre Sutton (Cork)
 1964 Alice Hussey (Dublin)
 1964 Teresa Murphy (Cork)
 1965 (Joint) Mairéad McAtamney (Antrim)
 1965 (Joint) Claire Hanrahan (Kilkenny)
 1966 (Joint) Mary Connery (Kilkenny)
 1966 (Joint) Maeve Gilroy (Antrim)
 1967 Úna O'Connor (Dublin)
 1968 Margaret O'Leary (Wexford)
 1973 Marie Costine (Cork)
 1974 Helena O'Neill (Kilkenny)
 1975 Bridget Doyle (Wexford)
 1976 Angela Downey (Kilkenny)
 1977 Bridie Martin (Kilkenny)
 1978 Pat Moloney (Cork)
 1979 Mairéad McAtamney (Antrim)
 1980 Marion McCarthy (Cork)
 1981 Liz Neary (Kilkenny)
 1982 Mary O'Leary (Cork)
 1983 Claire Cronin (Cork)
 1984 Yvonne Redmond (Dublin)
 1985 Angela Downey (Kilkenny)
 1986 Ann & Angela Downey (Kilkenny)
 1987 Breda Holmes (Kilkenny)
 1988 Biddy O'Sullivan (Kilkenny)
 1989 Ann & Angela Downey (Kilkenny)
 1991 Ann Downey (Kilkenny)
 1992 Sandie Fitzgibbon (Cork)
 1993 Linda Mellerick (Cork)
 1995 Sandie Fitzgibbon (Cork)
 1998 Linda Mellerick (Cork)
 1999 Deirdre Hughes (Tipperary)
 2000 Jovita Delaney (Tipperary)
 2001 Ciara Gaynor (Tipperary)
 2002 Fiona O'Driscoll (Cork)
 2005 Gemma O'Connor (Cork)
 2006 Mary O'Connor (Cork)
 2007 Kate Kelly (Wexford)
 2008 Aoife Murray (Cork)
 2009 Ann Dalton (Kilkenny)
 2015 Gemma O'Connor (Cork)
 2016 Denise Gaule (Kilkenny)
 2017 Rena Buckley (Cork)
 2018 Ann Dalton (Kilkenny)
 2019 Niamh Kilkenny (Galway)
 2020 Denise Gaule (Kilkenny)

Young Player of the Year
The first attempt at a young player of the year award was the Elvery's Cup for “Miss Camogie”, as much in the tradition of pageants as sports star awards, awarded to UCD Ashbourne Cup winning captain Patricia Morrissey in 1971. Another short-lived young player of the year award, sponsored by Levi's was awarded to Cork player Claire Cronin in 1976. It was established on an official basis in 2004.

 1971 Patricia Morrissey (Clare)
 1976 Claire Cronin (Cork)
 1977-2003 No award
 2004 Stephanie Gannon (Galway)
 2005 Colette McSorley (Armagh)
 2006 Marie Dargan (Kilkenny)
 2007 Niamh Mulcahy (Limerick)
 2008 Carina Roseingrave (Clare)
 2009 Denise Gaule (Kilkenny)
 2010 Laura Mitchell (Galway)

Intermediate player of the year
 2016 Ciara Holden (Kilkenny)
 2017 Claire Coffey (Meath)
 2018 Saoirse McCarthy (Cork)
 2019 Pamela Greville (Westmeath)
 2020 Niamh Mallon (Down)

Junior player of the year
Sponsored by AIB for the best player in the junior grade.
 
 1982 Vivienne Kelly (Louth)
 1983 Lillian Zinkant (Cork)
 1984 Patricia Fitzgibbon (Cork)
 1985 Deirdre Costello (Galway)
 1986 Maura McNicholas (Clare)
 1987 Miriam Malone (Kildare)
 2016 Eleanor Treacy (Carlow)
 2017 Aoife Bugler (Dublin)
 2018 Caragh Dawson (Dublin)

Manager of the Year

 2005 John Cronin (Cork)
 2006 Peter Lucey (Dublin)
 2007 (Joint) Stellah Sinnott (Wexford)
 2007 (Joint) Liam Dunne (Wexford)
 2007 (Joint) Stephen Dormer (Kilkenny)
 2009 Denise Cronin (Cork)
 2010 Joachim Kelly (Offaly)
 2011 JJ Doyle (Wexford)
 2012 JJ Doyle (Wexford)
 2013 Tony Ward (Galway)
 2014 Joe Quaid (Limerick)
 2015 Paudie Murray (Cork)
 2016 Ann Downey (Kilkenny)
 2017 Paudie Murray (Cork)
 2018 Paudie Murray (Cork)

Gradam Tailte
A skills competition in which players competed in a variety of skills. The Poc Fada competition, winners listed elsewhere, also has a camogie section.

 (Awarded 1982-88 for skill tests)
 1982 Josephine McClements (Antrim)
 1983 Claire Cronin (Cork)
 1984 Angela Downey (Kilkenny)
 1985 Angela Downey (Kilkenny)
 1986 Angela Downey (Kilkenny)
 1987 Bernie Farrelly (Kildare)
 1988 Bernie Farrelly (Kildare)

Texaco Award for Camogie
Selected by the sports editors of national newspapers in 10 nominated sports each year.

 1966 Úna O'Connor (Dublin)
 1967 Sue Cashman (Antrim)
 1986 Angela Downey (Kilkenny)
 2003 Eimear McDonnell (Tipperary)
 2004 Una O'Dwyer (Tipperary)
 2008 Briege Corkery (Cork)

International player of the year
(Awarded in 2004, discontinued). 2004 Annette McGeeney from Roscommon and Sligo IT. The other nominees were Róisin O'Neill (Britain) and Rosie O'Reilly (USA).

See also
GAA All Stars Awards Past Winners (Football)
GAA All Stars Awards Past Winners (Hurling)
GAA All Stars Awards Past Winners (Ladies Football)
GAA All Stars Awards

References

External links
 Full list of nominated players in 2004. 2005, 2006, 2007, 2008, 2009, 2010 and 2011
 Camogie.ie Official Camogie Association Website
 On The Ball Official Camogie Magazine Issue 1 and issue 2

2003 establishments in Ireland
Awards established in 2003
Camogie awards